Widdlesworth was a Christian indie rock band from Akron, Ohio. Widdlesworth was formed in November 2003 by Ryland Raus as an acoustic solo project. Soon he added drummer Jesse Trillet and bassist Ricky Dyson to the line up to make Widdlesworth a full band. They began practicing regularly at this time though they only played a few shows since Widdlesworth was still viewed as more or less a side project as Ryland put most his time and effort into playing and practicing with the street punk band My Son Cid. As the summer of 2004 rolled to an end Ryland parted ways with My Son Cid and focused all his energy on Widdlesworth. It was at this time they added a second guitarist, Tony Livigni and a new drummer, Chris Kingsland.

In October 2004, the newly formed Widdlesworth took the stage for the first time. Since then they have played over 80 shows throughout Ohio, Indiana, and Pennsylvania building a name for themselves locally.(having shared the stage with bands such as Relient K, Fear Before the March of Flames, Scary Kids Scaring Kids, Far-Less, John Reuben, Family Force Five, The Rocket Summer, Anathallo, and The Myriad to name a few)

In November 2005, Widdlesworth headed into the studio to record. The results of these sessions, which lasted several months, was Widdlesworth's debut album "I Am Not A Theory". The album was released independently on March 26, 2006 by way of a release party to a near sell out crowd at Akron, Ohio's Lime Spider. By this time, Ryland had set aside playing guitar live to focus more on vocals. Chris Solyntjes was brought in January 2006 to pick up the live guitar parts.

On August 15, 2006 the band announced that they were breaking up due to the members wanting to pursue different things with their lives. Ryland and Chris K. have both continued to pursue music.

Ryland Raus is currently the lead vocalist for the Christian metalcore band Inhale Exhale on Solid State Records. Chris Kingsland is currently the lead vocalist for the Christian metalcore band Outrun the Gun. Chris Solyntjes is currently playing guitar and bass for the indie rock band The Sewing Machine War.

Ryland Raus is now the rhythm guitarist and backing vocalist of Attack Attack!.

Members
Ryland Raus – Lead Vocals
Ricky Dyson – Bass
Tony Livigni – Guitar
Chris Kingsland – drums, Backing Vocals
Chris Solyntjes – Guitar, Backing Vocals

Former members
Jesse Trillet – drums

Discography
Metrognome EP (2005)
I Am Not A Theory (2006)

References

Christian rock groups from Ohio
Indie rock musical groups from Ohio
Musical groups from Akron, Ohio
Musical groups established in 2003